Level Up is a live-action comedy television series that aired on Cartoon Network. A film with the same title, which served as a pilot for the series, premiered on November 23, 2011. The series aired from January 24, 2012, to February 19, 2013. Level Up was the second Cartoon Network show spawned from a live-action film, with the first being Out of Jimmy's Head.

Premise 
After high schoolers Wyatt, Lyle, Dante and Angie unwittingly open a portal from a video game called Maldark: Conqueror of All Worlds into the real world, characters from the game and the Internet start leaking into the real world of the four teenage characters. The group consequently finds itself balancing its members' everyday lives with the extraordinary things that show up in their town from the virtual world which always resorts to using NeverFail to help send the monsters back into the game by "barding" them.

Characters

Heroes
 Wyatt Black (portrayed by Gaelan Connell) – Wyatt is a brilliant "techno-geek" who attains perfect grades at school. He is often shown to be a know-it-all and cannot stand when someone bests him at anything he is good at. As seen in the movie, he created NeverFail as well as organizing all the missions and lead the team in battle. He is the captain, and only competent member, of his quiz bowl team. His game avatar is "Black Death," a strong warrior with a bronze right arm. Wyatt's weapon in the game is the "Blast-a-Ton," a weapon capable of firing almost anything as ammunition.
 Lyle Hugginson (portrayed by Jessie Usher) – Lyle plays American football and is the high school quarterback. He's a charming, popular "jock" who purposefully conceals his love of online fantasy games from other people. Lyle loves to shout "Huzza!" when something goes right. He owns a red Chevy Camaro that he often uses to transport himself and the others. It is also shown that he will go to any means to repay a debt; even selling his car. His video game avatar is a Dread Orc named "Wizza" and his weapon in the game is the "Thunder Pole" staff.
 Dante Ontero (portrayed by Connor Del Rio) – Fearless and impulsive, Dante is the rebellious member of the group. He loves causing trouble to get attention as well as eating junk food or anything gross (namely anything that had expired). He frequently engages in dangerous stunts on his skateboard in order to make internet videos. He has a poor relationship with his mother, whom he refers to by her first name, Barbara. His video game avatar is a Shiny Knight called "Sir Bickle." Dante's weapon in the game is the "Skull Cracker" club.
 Angie Prietto (portrayed by Aimee Carrero) – Angie's is portrayed as a smart, spunky, and tenacious character, but her inquisitive nature occasionally results in problems for the female teenager. Angie does not have an avatar as she does not play the game, but her weapon from the video game is the "Fist of Schoolage," a glove that becomes an armored fist.
 Max Ross (portrayed by Lonny Ross) – Max Ross created the online fantasy game "Conqueror of All Worlds." He's an eccentric multi-billionaire with a taste for conspiracy theories. Following the events of Maldark's attack, Max has become an associate to the kids. He was previously portrayed by Eric André in the film.
 Laserbot (voiced by Andrea Fraser-Winsby) – A robot created by Max Ross.
 Joaquin Prietto (portrayed by Isaiah Lehtinen) – Angie's little brother who is a prodigy at everything he does as the guys are jealous when their talents are outdone. He befriends the guys when they babysit him and is also a fan of "Conquer of All Worlds." He's somewhat suspicious of what they do and he came close to their secret in "Heckfire Tiger," but believes that they are secretly LARPers. In "The 4 Harolds! What? Oh. The 4 Heralds!" Joaquin finally learns the truth about the Leaks. He later officially joined NeverFail and began using his video game character's weapon, "The War Hammer of Splat."

Villains
 Maldark (portrayed by John Novak) – The main antagonist of the series. He's a ruthless and narcissistic sorcerer from the "Conqueror of All Worlds" video game whose sole mission is to seek out new worlds and either destroy them or conquer them. Wyatt, Lyle, Dante, Angie, and Max were able to defeat Maldark. Of course, Maldark still plans to take over Earth by sending some of his minions to fight Neverfail and find a portal for him to get to Earth. He was previously portrayed by George Faughnan in the film.
 Hideo Nojima (portrayed by James Rha) – A Japanese multi-billionaire game designer of the fictional cell phone game "Mystery Puzzle Puncher." He is the rival of Max Ross whose rivalry has gone on since an early career in game designing, college, and elementary school. He came to Daventry Hills to destroy Max Ross with his business. He finds out about the town's leaks after his game character leaks out due to Max's server hacking his. He then sends out his own leaks and swears to ruin Max. After his Leak counterpart was defeated by Max and his counterpart, Hideo plans to have his revenge on Max and NeverFail.

Leaks
Some of the Leaks are creatures from "Conqueror of All Worlds" that have leaked into Earth. There were also other Leaks that come from anything associated with the Internet. The following are listed in order of appearance:

 Holiday Orcs – A group of Christmas-themed orcs. They were "barded" by the male Mountain Barbarian.
 Mountain Barbarians – The Mountain Barbarians are human warriors that have curiosity and strength. After the male Mountain Barbarian (portrayed by Mark Gibbon) helped to defeat the Holiday Orcs, Dante and his friends had the male Mountain Barbarian pass off as an exchange student named Bob Arian when they are unable to send it back into the game. The Mountain Barbarian's wife (played by Hailey Birnie) leaked onto Earth and managed to get the Mountain Barbarian back into the game.
 Morthorn Worm – A creature from the "beta" version of the game. Its home was deleted by Max which caused it to break through to the real world and make wormholes.
 Black Death (portrayed by Dave Collette) – Wyatt's avatar. he was sent to the human world when Wyatt accidentally spills his soda onto his keyboard. Because he is an avatar, he cannot move on his own, requiring somebody to control him via keyboard.
 Bicyclops (portrayed by Jason Simpson) – A cyclops with a second eye above its one eye. The Bicyclopes have poor vision and must wear special glasses that can read people's emotions, feelings, and thoughts to see. If a Bicyclops loses its glasses, it will keep respawning until it reclaims its glasses.
 Silversmith Dwarf
 Scorcaling Forest Goracal
 Exploding Meemees
 Fewards of Flail Land
 Hampire (portrayed by Andy Nez) – A creature that is part vampire, part hamster. The Hampire has the appearance of a vampire and can turn into a hamster. He was created by Maldark and sent to the human world to spy on the NeverFail clan in his hamster form. It was flushed back into the game by Lyle.
 Rainbow Rider – A high-speed rainbow sprite.
 Snotling Goggler
 Hanabañero Dragon – A Lvl. 72 dragon who is the boss of Scofield Dungeon.
 Max's Profile (portrayed by Lonny Ross) – A dating profile of Max Ross that leaked out from the Internet. If you change the profile in any way, he changes into whatever the profile says. For example, when Wyatt had it changed to him being afraid of tablecloths, he ripped the tablecloth off of the table with all of his and his date Barbara's food on the floor. When the gang deleted the profile, he disappeared.
 Dupligänger – A two-headed monster with one side of its body being red while the other side of its body is yellow. It needs to be attacked with two weapons simultaneously or else it will split into two.
 Trash Troll – A troll who will trash anything. They resemble Swamp Trolls, but have mud, dirt, and green splatter all over them. He is known for stealing everything from players he beats in the game, and putting the people themselves inside his sack.
 Jack (portrayed by Morgan Roff) – The main character from Jack and the Beanstalk who leaked out of Dante's eBook. At first, he seems like a good guy and Dante's friend. But afterwards, they find out that he steals many things form the Giant, NeverFail, and Angie. Jack just claims that he was just "borrowing them." After NeverFail got Jack to listen to reason upon bringing out the Big Bad Wolf, Dante manages to get Jack and the Giant to work on their aggression by using foam bats.
Giant (portrayed by John DeSantis) – A giant from Jack and the Beanstalk who leaked out of Dante's eBook. Dante always thought of him as a bad guy, but after he finds out that Jack is a thief, he realizes that the Giant has a reason to hate Jack. Dante manages to get Jack and the Giant to work on their aggression by using foam bats.
Snow White (portrayed by Kendra Anderson) – The titled story book character who leaked out to help negotiate with Jack.
Sherlock Holmes (portrayed by Tariq Leslie) – NeverFail leaked him out in order to help find Jack.
Big Bad Wolf – NeverFail had to bring out the Big Bad Wolf in order to negotiate with Jack.
Jester – An odd humanoid creature with a bugle for a mouth. It rewards players for completing its fetch quest.
 Woodland Fairy
 Acid-Spitting Mini Dragon – A miniature dragon of blended purple-red color that flies and spits acid. Their weakest spots are their wings and that is how you defeat them.
 Sir Guy (portrayed by Christopher Gauthier) – An NPC nobleman who needs Dante's help to complete a side quest so he can level up. The quests involve catching frogs and defeating an elite Five-Armed Blood Marauder that was terrorizing his village.
 Five-Armed Blood Marauder (portrayed by Michasha Armstrong) – A marauder with five arms. Dante had to help Sir Guy into fighting an elite Five-Armed Blood Marauder that was terrorizing Sir Guy's village. Dante managed to successfully bard the Five-Armed Blood Marauder.
 Skunkbear (portrayed by John DeSantis) – A humanoid creature that is part skunk, part bear. They can emit smelly odors from their armpits which Dante said smelled like Smelly Gym Socks, "Toe Cheese," and Dirty Diapers.
Bounty Hunter (portrayed by Jud Tylor) – A female shape-shifting bounty hunter with horns who leaks from the game because Angie accidentally pastes a photo of Wyatt on a wall of wanted people in the game. Because of this, she wants to hunt him down. She can go without being found out about as shown when he appears on Wyatt's leak-detecting app, but not when anyone else beside Wyatt looks at it. She blended in with the humans by assuming the form of a substitute teacher named Ms. Lindenlooper. Once she was seen by Angie, Dante, and Lyle, they helped Wyatt to bard the Bounty Hunter.
Merchant (portrayed by Richard Newman) – The 10th evilest character in "Conqueror of All Worlds". He was purposely leaked by Max Ross to promote his new expansion pack. To get control of him during the promotion, Max had the Merchant wears a shock collar. Until it is removed while he is working, the Merchant then sets out to prove he can be the number 1 villain in "Conqueror of All Worlds" by taking over all of the business in the area. He is barded in the end by NeverFail.
 Swirling Giver (portrayed by Tony Alcantar) – Also known as "Swirly", the Swirling Giver is a leak that hands out gold and in return demands to be paid back. Usually with gold, favors, or hanging out with someone till he annoys them. When angered, he gives them a swirly then eats their face off. Lyle is one of his victims who offers his services until he is ordered to capture Dante.
 Invizio (portrayed by Nolan Prasad) – A ghost who leaks into the high school. He lived in a ghost town until NeverFail brought all the ghosts back to life. Invizio wanted revenge on them for that action. When Lyle managed to bring him back to life, Wyatt defeats him in order to bard him back into the game.
 Courtesy Cat (portrayed by Brian McCaig) – A talking humanoid cat wearing a blue sweater who offers helpful advice to people. When angered from his warnings being ignored, he turns into the Heckfire Tiger (portrayed by Paul Lazenby) which is a humanoid masked wrestler wearing a tiger face paint and blue wrestling tights. When Courtesy Cat first appeared, it was mistaken for the Crosstown Cougar mascot of Crosstown High School. When apologized to, Heckfire Tiger weakens and turns back into Courtesy Cat. NeverFail used this tactic to defeat Heckfire Tiger and barded Courtesy Cat back into the game.
 Asp (portrayed by Laura Soltis) – Half-woman, half-snake. She is one of Maldark's servants who searched for a weak spot in order to get Maldark to get to Earth while posing as Vice-Principal Asp of Crosstown High School. When she infiltrated NeverFail's base to look for a weak spot, she manages to Dante and Lyle trapped until Wyatt and Angie freed them. NeverFail then proceeded to bard Asp and thwart Maldark's plot.
 Vomit Varmit – A small purple troll that emits blue vomit.
 Glamazons – A group of Amazonian warriors who seek out and challenge the strongest people called "The Glamazonian Death Challenge". The challenge consists of three events that involve speed, hand-to-hand combat, and accuracy. The winner receives a prize, while the loser loses their head. The prize is to be sacrificed to Rhea. Once Rhea was defeated, the Glamazons were freed from Rhea.
 Glamazon Queen (portrayed by Karen Holness) – The Queen of the Glamazons.
 Grinella (portrayed by Sharon Taylor) – Member of the Glamazons.
 Rhea (portrayed by Karin Konoval) – A Gorgon that the Glamazons have been menaced by. She often accepts sacrifices that involve giving up the winner of the Glamazon Death Challenge to her. Wyatt, Lyle, and Dante tried to stop Rhea, but she turned to stone. With help from Grinella, Angie used the mirror to turn Rhea's powers against her enough for her to be sent back into the game and undo the effects of her petrifying gaze. Rhea's petrified form then disappeared back into the game.
Dwarven Butler – A dwarf butler who wears 16th-century/Steampunk-based attire.
 Potions Wizard (portrayed by Jay Brazeau) – A wizard who makes potions that leaked out of the game and gave Dante a free potion in exchange for not leaking him. His plan is to put everyone sleep with sleep powder and to shrink the Earth like he's done with several other planets. He was barded by Lyle.
 Wachupa – A small reptilian creature in the game that is based on a fictional urban legend. In the game, it is a pet created by Max Ross to be a pet that reviews constant love and attention. If it doesn't receive love and attention, it will explode.
 Moo Man (portrayed by Patrick Sabongui) – A man with bull-like hooves, horns, and tendencies (such as charging at the color red) that wears a nose ring. The Moo Men are known to attack villages and take breaks in their attacks by grazing in the fields. One was bombarded by another leak from the game who happened to be Hugo Vega Soro. Another Moo Man arrived looking for his son Hugo in order to bring him back. Hugo convinced his father to let him stay and Hugo's father is barded into the game by Wyatt.
 Hugo Vega Soro (portrayed by Reinaldo Zavarce) – A leak that felt like an outcast in his world due to him being the son of a Moo Man. He left the game to live a peaceful life. Hugo eventually became an author of Wyatt's favorite comic book "The Peaceful Prince," a book based on his life in the game. He is befriended by Wyatt. After dealing with Hugo's father, NeverFail allowed Hugo to live in the real world and act as their "leak on the street."
 Dante Jr. – A web cartoon created by Dante on Max's computer that leaked out of the game and went on a rampage. He kidnapped Dante's history teacher after giving a Dante a bad grade. Dante Jr. was barded by NeverFail
 Thomas Jeffer: Son of Frankenstein (portrayed by Rodger Barton) – A Frankenstein's Monster-themed 18th Century revolutionary who was another web cartoon created by Dante as a part of a history class assignment. He was leaked out by Dante to take on Dante Jr. by using his non-sensual creativity and genius. After Dante Jr. was defeated, Max decided to put Thomas Jeffer in "Conqueror of All Worlds".
 Puzzle Puncher Boxer (portrayed by Darcy Hinds) – A boxing character from "Mystery Puzzle Puncher".
 Mystery Puzzle Cube – A puzzle cube leaked out by Hideo.
 Evil Hideo (portrayed by James Rha) – A leak designed by Hideo in his own image as a wizard. He was barded by Max and his Laserbot.
 John (portrayed by Sean Tyson) – A blacksmith that was leaked out by Dante to pose as his dad when meeting with Vice-Principal Elmhurst to talk about Dante's suspension. He was known to feud with Nessus who was in love with John's horse Cinnamon. Once John and Nessus were in the same area, Wyatt barded both of them with a single missile.
 Nessus (portrayed by Matt Ward) – A centaur who once sold his magic horseshoe to Lyle. He has been in love with a horse named Cinnamon and was hunted by John the Blacksmith. When Barbara caught a glimpse of him, she fainted at first sight. Once John and Nessus were in the same area, Wyatt barded both of them with a single missile. He was named for the centaur who killed the Greek hero Hercules.
 Ochi (portrayed by Alex Zahara) – An Orc that was the former right-hand man of King Okavango. He cleaned up NeverFail's hideout and worked as their servant. NeverFail took him for granted and Ochi ended up being an unwitting pawn in King Okavango's revenge when King Okavango leaked onto Earth. When King Okavango wanted Ochi to finish off NeverFail after they ended up in King Okavango's trap, Ochi instead barded King Okavango. Once Max had freed NeverFail, he managed to trap Ochi on a dangling hook as Dante bards him.
King Okavango (portrayed by Mark Acheson) – An Orc king that was overthrown by NeverFail in the game. King Okavango later leaked onto Earth where Ochi partook in King Okavango's revenge on NeverFail. When King Okavango wanted Ochi to finish off NeverFail after they ended up in King Okavango's trap, Ochi instead barded King Okavango.
 Titocona (portrayed by Mig Macario) – An NPC zen monk that Lyle had taken pacifist lessons from. Titocona leaked out of the game in order to set Mr. Cochrane straight. He chased after Mr. Cochrane until he was barded by Angie. Afterwards, Mr. Cochrane believed that Titocona's attack was part of Prank Week.
Cactus Kaiser (portrayed by Andy Thompson in a German accent) – A humanoid cactus that comes from the Deutsch Desert. The quills of the Cactus Kaiser are poisonous. Lyle acted as a pacifist around the Cactus Kaiser where they talked about the Cactus Kaiser's fight with the Moist Monsters for 92 minutes. Cactus Kaiser takes up Lyle's advice and goes back into the game to negotiate peace with the Moist Monsters. The Cactus Kaiser later returned where he told NeverFail that Lyle's advice worked and is now marrying a Moist Monster.
 Heralds of the Maldarkian Apocalypse – A group of four monster that bring about the Maldarkian Apocalypse (which is also known as the Maldarkalypse).
 Ice Titan (portrayed by Fraser Aitcheson) – A ice-elemental monster. When it grabbed onto a wet pole during the fight against NeverFail, it was barded by Dante.
 Fire Titan (portrayed by Aidan Pringle) – A fire-elemental monster. Wyatt, Lyle, and Dante had a hard time fighting the Fire Titan. Angie tried to take on the Fire Titan only for her Fist of Schoolage attack to not being able to phase it. When the Fire Titan has Angie cornered, she pulls off a diversion to try to contact the others. With help from Joaquin, the rest of NeverFail arrived. Joaquin tricked the Water Titan into colliding with the Fire Titan in order for them to bard each other.
 Wind Titan – A wind-elemental monster. Joaquin fought the Wind Titan online to keep it from leaking onto Earth.
 Water Titan (portrayed by Paul Lazenby) – A water-elemental monster. Joaquin tricked the Water Titan into colliding with the Fire Titan in order for them to bard each other.
 Momcubus (portrayed by Chelah Horsdal) – A six-armed monster created by Dante on Max's computer. The Momcubus was modeled after Barbara. She was barded by Joaquin.
 Lord of the Pies (portrayed by Jeremy Raymond) – A human with a pie-shaped hat. He comes to NeverFail when his son had leaked onto Earth and couldn't find him. NeverFail was able to reunite him with his son offscreen.
Bard (portrayed by Michael Teigen) – A bard that NeverFail leaked out to help convince Joaquin into helping NeverFail. An Insult Slug combined with the Bard to form a Bard/Insult Slug Hybrid (performed by Michael Teigen, voiced by Rob Webber) which made off with NeverFail's Booty Box. Joaquin joins up with NeverFail in order to help fight the Bard/Insult Slug. After defeating the Bard/Insult Slug, NeverFail had to separate the Bard/Insult Slug back into the two creatures before they can bard them.
 Insult Slug (voiced by Pat Fraley) – A pink slug that can perform insult comedy upon anyone. It was leaked by Dante to help convince Joaquin into helping NeverFail. The Insult Slug combined with the Bard and made off with the NeverFail. Joaquin joins up with NeverFail in order to help fight the Bard/Insult Slug. After defeating the Bard/Insult Slug, NeverFail had to separate the Bard/Insult Slug back into the two creatures before they can bard them.

Other characters
Principal Storms (portrayed by Lorne Cardinal) – The Principal of Daventry Hills North High School.
Vice-Principal Elmhurst (portrayed by Sarah Strange) – The vice-principal of Daventry Hills North High School.
Coach Farber (portrayed by Kurt Evans) – The football coach of Daventry Hills North High School.
 Dave (voiced by Keith Blackman Davis) – The janitor of Daventry Hills North High School.
 Barbara (portrayed by Chelah Horsdal) – The mother of Dante, who calls her by her first name. She and Dante have a poor relationship. Barbara was previously portrayed by Rhoda Griffs in the film.
 Teddy Black (portrayed by Tobias Slezak) – The father of Wyatt.
Mayor Hugginson (portrayed by Peter James Bryant) – The father of Lyle and the Mayor of Daventry Hills. He was previously portrayed by Geoffrey Williams in the film.
 Big Joe (portrayed by Kurt Ostlund) – Big Joe is the school bully who picks mainly on Wyatt.
 Reggie (portrayed by Sunee Dhaliwal) – Reggie is on the football team and is Lyle's friend.
 Weird Karl (portrayed by Albert Ageman) – Karl is a creepy-looking kid who makes his own choices, and is suspicious about Wyatt and his friends.
 Gus (portrayed by Erik McNamee) – Gus is an awkward acting boy who has a major crush on Angie though she doesn't return the feelings.
 Philbert (portrayed by Samuel Patrick Chu) – Philbert is a daredevil who is always seen with Dante or Wyatt, and is Angie's crush.
 Natalie (portrayed by Chanelle Peloso) – A overachieving school girl that speaks in a lisp. She is suspicious of the gang and also runs the "Conspiracy Club" a club dedicated to solving the town's conspiracy aka the Leaks (including the recent Skunkbear sightings) and come close until her group is discredited on live TV.
 Davis (portrayed by Michael Warren Choi) – A small Asian kid with black hair. He is best friends with Jim and they always seen together. They are part of the "Conspiracy Club".
 Jim (portrayed by Luke McAndless-Davis) – He is a tall kid with curly brown hair. He is best friends with Davis. Also is member of Natalie's "Conspiracy Club".
 Ginger (portrayed by Siobhan Williams) – Ginger is the know-it-all sassy member of student council and Wyatt's Quiz Bowl Team.
 Roxanne – A Canadian girl who Wyatt get crush on her. But She dates with Gus at the final due to she really likes cowardice-boys.
 Leroy (portrayed by Aren Buchholz) – Lyle's old friend who moved back to town he is aware that Dante hangs out with the guys and loves to play "Conqueror of All Worlds." He enjoys pranking and goes completely overboard such as wrecking the running man in HQ, framing Wyatt for using a freeze ray, ruining Lyle's quest in game, and standing up Angie. He ends up getting payback after a run in with a leak, but the gang plays it off as a joke. Leroy is suspicious and swears vengeance.
 Mr. Cochrane (portrayed by Panou) – A strict teacher who had previously left to attend an anger management class. He was so strict that even Principal Storms was afraid of him. When Lyle finally stood up to him, Titocona attacked and chased after Mr. Cochrane. After Titocona was barded, Mr. Cochrane believed that the experience was part of Prank Week.

Episodes

Series overview

Pilot film (2011)

Season 1 (2012)

Season 2 (2012–13)

Home media

Notes

References

External links
 Official website
 

2010s American comic science fiction television series
2010s American high school television series
2010s American single-camera sitcoms
2010s American teen sitcoms
2012 American television series debuts
2013 American television series endings
2010s Canadian comic science fiction television series
2010s Canadian high school television series
2010s Canadian teen sitcoms
2012 Canadian television series debuts
2013 Canadian television series endings
American adventure television series
American fantasy television series
Canadian adventure television series
Canadian fantasy television series
Cartoon Network original programming
Television series by Cartoon Network Studios
English-language television shows
Television series about teenagers
Television shows filmed in Vancouver